Igor Laikert (born February 27, 1991 in Zenica, Bosnia and Herzegovina) is an alpine skier from Bosnia and Herzegovina. He will compete for Bosnia and Herzegovina at the 2014 Winter Olympics in all the alpine skiing events.

The selection of alpine skier Žana Novaković as flagbearer for the 2014 Winter Olympics resulted in controversy as Igor Laikert had better results. There were suggestions that this had to due with the ethnic divide in the country with Laikert coming from the Muslim-Croat community.

Laikert participated at the 2011 World Military Skiing Championship in Bjelašnica he finished at 9th place in the men's Giant slalom event.

World Cup results

Results per discipline

World Championship results

Olympic results

See also
Bosnia and Herzegovina at the 2014 Winter Olympics

References

1991 births
Living people
Bosnia and Herzegovina male alpine skiers
Olympic alpine skiers of Bosnia and Herzegovina
Alpine skiers at the 2014 Winter Olympics
Sportspeople from Zenica